Čestmír Kožíšek (born 9 November 1991) is a Czech ski jumper from club LSK Lomnice nad Popelkou.

Career
Kožíšek appeared for the first time in Ski jumping Fis Cup in 2006. He came in 29th place in his first competition. Almost two years later, Kožíšek took his first podium in Fis-Cup, a third place Harrachov. In the Ski jumping Continental Cup, he has been in the top-ten four times, a 5th place as the best result. Kožíšek competed in the Ski jumping World Cup (the highest level in ski jumping) for the first time in Vancouver in 2009. He reached 43rd place as the best result there. Kožíšek came at the 5th place in FIS Junior Ski Jumping World Championships 2009. In Oberstdorf 2009 he took a new personal best and jumped 190,5 metres in the Qualification round and took a surprising 11th place.

References

Czech male ski jumpers
Universiade medalists in ski jumping
1991 births
Living people
Olympic ski jumpers of the Czech Republic
Ski jumpers at the 2018 Winter Olympics
Ski jumpers at the 2022 Winter Olympics
People from Jilemnice
Universiade silver medalists for the Czech Republic
Competitors at the 2015 Winter Universiade
Competitors at the 2017 Winter Universiade
Sportspeople from the Liberec Region